Cyclomania is a 2001 Finnish movie directed and written by Simo Halinen. Three teenage cyclists, two boys and a girl trying to balance friendship, competition and a growing romance.

The two good friends K (Lauri Nurkse) and Eetu (Tommi Mujunen) works as bicycle messengers in Helsinki, in the evenings they practice hard to qualify for the Finnish championships. Their lives change when Oona (Elena Leeve) starts working at the same company.

External links

Blind Spot Pictures: Cyclomania

2001 films
2001 romantic drama films
Cycling films
Finnish romantic drama films